Editor's Note (foaled April 26, 1993 in Kentucky) is an American thoroughbred racehorse. He was sired by 1992 U.S. Champion 2 YO Colt Forty Niner, who in turn was a son of Champion sire Mr. Prospector and out of the mare Beware Of The Cat.

Trained by D. Wayne Lukas and ridden by René Douglas, who was given the assignment after Gary Stevens was injured, Editor's Note is best known for his classic stretch duel with Skip Away in the 1996 Belmont Stakes, beating Preakness Stakes winner Louis Quatorze, who was unplaced.  This was the same race in which the Santa Anita Derby winner, Cavonnier, bowed a tendon and was unable to finish.

With the death of A.P. Indy on February 21, 2020, Editor's Note became the oldest living winner of the Belmont Stakes.  Upon the death of Grindstone on March 22, 2022, Editor's Note became the oldest living winner of any of the Triple Crown races of thoroughbred racing.

Retirement
Editor's Note was originally retired in 1997 to Overbrook Farm in Lexington, Kentucky, but was exported in 2004 to Argentina.

References
 Pedigree & Partial Stats

External links
 Washington Post Lukas Wins Belmont Again
 NY Times Editor's Note Retired

1993 racehorse births
Racehorses bred in Kentucky
Racehorses trained in the United States
Belmont Stakes winners
Thoroughbred family 8-c